Kevin Thomas Jarvis (born August 1, 1969) is a former Major League Baseball pitcher. He played professionally for many teams including the Cincinnati Reds, Minnesota Twins, Detroit Tigers, Oakland Athletics, Colorado Rockies, San Diego Padres, Seattle Mariners, St. Louis Cardinals, the Arizona Diamondbacks and the Boston Red Sox.

Biography
Jarvis was born in Lexington, Kentucky and graduated from Tates Creek High School in Lexington. He played college baseball at Wake Forest University. In 1989, he played collegiate summer baseball with the Harwich Mariners of the Cape Cod Baseball League, and returned to the league in 1990 to play for the Cotuit Kettleers.

Jarvis was drafted by the Cincinnati Reds in the 21st round of the 1991 Major League Baseball Draft. He made his major league debut in the strike-affected  season, posting a 1-1 record in 6 games from  innings pitched, playing for the Cincinnati Reds. He played with the Reds until , posting an overall record of 12-15, before being claimed off waivers by the Detroit Tigers on May 2, but was claimed again by the Minnesota Twins just one week later. He played in 6 games for the Twins without a decision in any game and a 12.46 ERA, before the Tigers claimed him back off waivers on June 17. At the end of the season, Jarvis ended up with an 0-4 record from 27 games pitched.

In , Jarvis moved to the Chunichi Dragons franchise in Japan, but only played in 4 games before signing a minor league contract with the Reds.  saw Jarvis at the Oakland Athletics, but only amassed 4 games for them. But he did help the Triple-A affiliate of the A's, the Vancouver Canadians to the Triple-A World Championship posting an excellent record of 10-2, before winning game 2 of the Triple-A World Championship.

 saw the 5th different franchise of Jarvis' career - the Colorado Rockies. He pitched mainly as a starter, starting 19 of his 24 games played, posting a 3-4 record, from 115 innings pitched.  saw the first of three seasons with the San Diego Padres, and was given the role of starting pitcher in every season. 2001 was by far his best major league season. He was 12-11 in 193 innings pitched with a 4.79 ERA, 133 strikeouts, and hit the only home run of his career (off Kent Bottenfield), but these numbers fell away, with the Padres (-), Seattle Mariners, Rockies (2004), St. Louis Cardinals, Diamondbacks, and Boston Red Sox (2006).

Jarvis is married to Elizabeth and they have two children (Bryce and Kennedy).  Prior to joining the Angels' scouting staff, Jarvis held a similar post with the San Diego Padres. His son Bryce is a pitcher in the Arizona Diamondbacks organization.

References

External links

Kevin Jarvis at Baseball Almanac

1969 births
Living people
American expatriate baseball players in Japan
Arizona Diamondbacks players
Arizona Diamondbacks scouts
Baseball players from Lexington, Kentucky
Boston Red Sox players
Chattanooga Lookouts players
Chunichi Dragons players
Cincinnati Reds players
Colorado Rockies players
Colorado Springs Sky Sox players
Cotuit Kettleers players
Detroit Tigers players
Harwich Mariners players
Indianapolis Indians players
Los Angeles Angels scouts
Los Angeles Angels of Anaheim scouts
Major League Baseball pitchers
Memphis Redbirds players
Minnesota Twins players
Nashville Sounds players
Oakland Athletics players
St. Louis Cardinals players
San Diego Padres players
San Diego Padres scouts
Seattle Mariners players
Tates Creek High School alumni
Toledo Mud Hens players
Tucson Sidewinders players
Cedar Rapids Reds players
Charleston Wheelers players
Lake Elsinore Storm players
Mobile BayBears players
Modesto A's players
Princeton Reds players
Vancouver Canadians players
Winston-Salem Spirits players
American expatriate baseball players in Canada